Athimarapatti is a panchayat town in Thoothukudi district  in the state of Tamil Nadu, India.

Demographics
 India census, Athimarapatti had a population of 17,527. Males constitute 51% of the population and females 49%. Athimarapatti has an average literacy rate of 68%, higher than the national average of 59.5%; with 53% of the males and 47% of females literate. 13% of the population is under 6 years of age.

This village is 9 km from Tuticorin city. A narrow road between Spic Nagar and Muthaiyapuram takes you to this beautiful village. Either side of the road you can find beautiful greenery. "As far as Athimarapatti is concerned, banana plantation is the main occupation."

References

Villages in Thoothukudi district